Aurelius Township may refer to the following places in the United States:

Aurelius Township, Michigan
Aurelius Township, Washington County, Ohio

Township name disambiguation pages